Orlando shooting may refer to:
 Murder of Christina Grimmie, an American singer who was fatally shot on June 10, 2016
 Orlando nightclub shooting, a 2016 terrorist attack inside Pulse, a gay nightclub that killed 49 people and injured 58 others
 Orlando factory shooting, a 2017 workplace shooting at Fiamma, a factory that killed 5 people